Premier Handball League (PHL) is India's professional men's handball league. The inaugural season will take place from 2023. The league is an initiative between the Handball Federation of India and Bluesport Entertainment Private Limited. Premier Handball League uses a franchise-based model.

History 
The Premier Handball League encompasses six franchises, each representing cities across India. The teams were officially announced at a press conference in Jaipur. Th first season should be held between 8 and 25 June 2023.

Teams

Broadcaster
The broadcaters of the first season were announced on 30 January 2023:
Sports18
JioCinema
FanCode

References

External links
  

Indian Premier Handball League
Professional sports leagues in India
2020 establishments in India
Sport in India
Sports leagues established in 2020